Göcek Tüneli is a road tunnel in Dalaman, Muğla. The tunnel goes through D400 road. It takes its name from Göcek. It was opened on 9 September 2006, by the president of the term Recep Tayyip Erdoğan.

References

Road tunnels in Turkey
Fethiye District
Tunnels in Turkey